Heute (literally "Today") was a Swiss German-language free daily newspaper, published between 2006 and 2008 by Ringier in Zurich.

History and operations
Published in tabloid format, Heute was first published on 15 May 2006. It was an afternoon paper.

The paper was the second ' (commuter newspaper) in Switzerland, after the morning newspaper 20 Minuten, being distributed in the evenings, from approximately 3pm.

With a claimed initial print run of 200,000, the newspaper was said to have been one of the most popular daily newspapers in Switzerland according to the publisher's own statistics.

The paper ceased publication with a final edition on 30 May 2008. As from 2 June 2008 Heute was replaced by another free newspaper Blick am Abend.

See also
 List of newspapers in Switzerland

References

External links
 www.blickamabend.ch (in German), the website of successor publication Blick am Abend

2006 establishments in Switzerland
2008 disestablishments in Switzerland
Defunct newspapers published in Switzerland
Defunct free daily newspapers
German-language newspapers published in Switzerland
Newspapers published in Zürich
Publications established in 2006
Publications disestablished in 2008